Íñigo Cervantes was the defending champion, but chose not to defend his title.

Guido Andreozzi won the title when Pere Riba retired in the final.

Seeds

Draw

Finals

Top half

Bottom half

External Links
 Main Draw
 Qualifying Draw

Internazionali di Tennis Citta di Vicenza - Singles
2016 Singles
AON